The 1989 African U-16 Qualifying for World Cup was a qualifying edition organized by the Confederation of African Football (CAF) into the FIFA U-16 World Championship. The three winners qualified to the 1989 FIFA U-16 World Championship.

First round
The first leg matches were played on either 2 or 3 July 1988. The second leg matches were played on either 16 or 24 July 1988. The winners advanced to the Second round.

|}

Morocco advanced after 2−0 on aggregate.

Guinea advanced on penalties freekick 4–3 after a draw of 2–2 on aggregate.

Algeria advanced after the withraw of Senegal.

Zambia advanced after the withraw of Lesotho.

Mauritius advanced after the withraw of Madagascar.

Zaire advanced after the withraw of Kenya.

Gabon advanced after the withraw of Angola.

Cameroon advanced after the withraw of Liberia.

Ghana advanced after the withraw of Togo.

Second round
The first leg matches were played on either 2 or 4 September 1988. The second leg matches were played on either 16 or 18 September 1988. The winners advanced to the Third Round.

|}

Ghana advanced on away goal after 2−2 on aggregate.

Zambia advanced after 14−1 on aggregate.

Guinea advanced after 6−0 on aggregate.

Egypt advanced after 2−1 on aggregate.

Nigeria advanced after 4−2 on aggregate.

Ivory Coast advanced after the withraw of Gabon.

Third round
The first leg matches were played on 8 January 1989. The second leg matches were played on 20 January 1989. The winners qualified for the 1989 FIFA U-16 World Championship.

|}

Guinea qualified on penalties free kick 4–3 after a draw of 1–1 on aggregate.

Nigeria qualified after 5−0 on aggregate.

Ghana qualified after 3−1 on aggregate.

Countries to participate in 1989 FIFA U-16 World Championship
The 3 teams which qualified for 1989 FIFA U-16 World Championship.

External links
Details qualifying - rsssf.com

1989 in African football
African U-16 Qualifying for World Cup